The 1966 Kansas Jayhawks football team represented the University of Kansas in the Big Eight Conference during the 1966 NCAA University Division football season. In their ninth and final season under head coach Jack Mitchell, the Jayhawks compiled a 2–7–1 record (0–6–1 against conference opponents), tied for last place in the Big Eight Conference, and were outscored by opponents by a combined total of 188 to 106. They played their home games at Memorial Stadium in Lawrence, Kansas.

The team's statistical leaders included Donnie Shanklin with 732 rushing yards, Halley Kampschroeder with 278 receiving yards and Bob Skahan with 299 passing yards. Jerry Barnett and Bill Wohlford were the team captains.

Schedule

References

Kansas
Kansas Jayhawks football seasons
Kansas Jayhawks football